KDJE (100.3 FM, "100.3 The Edge") is an active rock radio station located in Little Rock, Arkansas (licensed to suburban Jacksonville).  The station's studios are located in West Little Rock, and the transmitter tower is located on Shinall Mountain, near the Chenal Valley neighborhood of Little Rock.

Kevin Cruise is the current program director and Matt Cruz serves as assistant program director. The Edge signed on as a rock station in 2003, where 100.3 previously played hot-contemporary Top 40 music. However, in 2009, the station began incorporating classic heavy metal music by bands such as: Black Sabbath, Mötley Crüe, and also Led Zeppelin and AC/DC into their typical active rock format.

References

External links
Official website

DJE
Active rock radio stations in the United States
Radio stations established in 1969
1969 establishments in Arkansas
IHeartMedia radio stations